"Mafiosa" is a song by Lartiste featuring vocals from Brazilian singer Caroliina. The song peaked at number two in France and was Lartiste's highest charting song.

Charts

Certifications

References

2018 songs
2018 singles
French-language songs
Portuguese-language songs
Macaronic songs